John Q. is a 2002 American thriller drama film starring Denzel Washington and directed by Nick Cassavetes. The film tells the story of John Quincy Archibald (Denzel Washington), a father and husband whose son is diagnosed with an enlarged heart and who finds out he is unable to receive a transplant because HMO insurance will not cover it, before he decides to hold hostages at the hospital and force them to do it.

The film co-stars Robert Duvall, Kimberly Elise, Anne Heche, James Woods, and Ray Liotta. The film was shot in Toronto, Hamilton, Ontario, and Canmore, Alberta, although the story takes place in Chicago. Shooting took place for 60 days from August 8 to November 3, 2000. The film was released on February 15, 2002. It received generally negative reviews from critics; however, the film grossed $102 million worldwide.

Plot 

A young woman is killed in a collision with a truck. Weeks earlier in Chicago, factory worker John Quincy Archibald and his wife Denise are behind with their house payments. One day after church they rush their young son Michael to the hospital after he collapses at his baseball game, and are told by cardiologist Dr. Raymond Turner and administrator Rebecca Payne that Michael needs a heart transplant or he will die. John and Denise have only $1,000 in savings, and they are informed that the hospital requires a $75,000 down payment of the procedure's $250,000 cost to simply place Michael on the organ transplant list. To make matters worse, John discovers that his work’s health insurance will not cover the surgery.

John and Denise struggle to raise the money and the hospital prepares to send Michael home to die when the couple exhausts all their opportunities and they still come up short. Determined to save his son, John takes Dr. Turner and several patients and staff hostage at gunpoint in the ER. Police negotiator Lt. Frank Grimes makes contact with John, who demands Payne put Michael's name on the organ transplant list.

Grimes clashes with his superior Chief Gus Monroe, while most of the hostages sympathize with John's plight and reflect on the flaws of America's healthcare system. One of the nurses revealed that Michael's condition could have been detected much earlier during routine checkup but the doctor ignored it to gain bonus from insurance company to keep his mouth shut to maintain their profit. Agreeing to release some of the patients, John is attacked by hostage Mitch, whose abused girlfriend Julie helps John subdue and handcuff Mitch. John frees expectant couple Steve and Miriam and immigrant mother Rosa with her infant son, who all declare their support for John to the news crews outside. Grimes and Payne reveal John's actions to Denise, and Payne places Michael on the list to perform the operation pro bono.

Overriding Grimes, Monroe has a SWAT sniper enter the ER via an air shaft, luring John into the line of fire with a phone call from Denise. John speaks with Michael as his condition worsens, while a news crew hacks the police surveillance feed and broadcasts John's conversation with his family. John discovers the hacked news footage just as the sniper fires, wounding him in the shoulder. John overpowers the sniper and uses him as a human shield as he reiterates his demands in front of a cheering crowd. As night falls, Michael is removed from the ICU and brought to the ER in exchange for the sniper's release, while Denise waits at the police command post along with her and John's friends Jimmy and Gina Palumbo.

John reveals his intention to die by suicide to save Michael with his own heart, and also reveals that his gun was empty all along. He persuades Turner to perform the operation, and Julie and security guard Max bear witness to John's impromptu will. He says his goodbyes to Michael, and prepares to end his own life using the only bullet he brought, when Denise brings news that the heart of a recently deceased organ donor – the motorist from the beginning of the film – is on the way. Once the heart arrives, John releases the hostages, including patient Lester, who surrenders to police posing as John. John, posing as a surgeon, accompanies Michael to the operating room where Grimes, who noticed the switch, allows him to watch Michael's operation before arresting him.

Three months later, John's actions have sparked national debate about healthcare, and in court his family, friends and all the hostages testify on his behalf at trial. John is ultimately acquitted of attempted murder and armed criminal action, but convicted of kidnapping and false imprisonment. His lawyer assures him that he will likely serve no more than two years. As John is escorted from the courthouse, Lester proclaims him as a hero, and now-healthy Michael gains eye contact with his father, saying "Dad!" and then, "Thank you".

Cast

Production
According to the commentary on the Deleted Scenes with Cassavetes and writer James Kearns, the main theme of the movie was said to be "about a miracle and John's faith in God creating the miracle". They also mentioned how SWAT team advisors for the film related a similar true incident in Toronto where a man (Henry Masuka) took an ER hostage after it would not provide immediate service to his infant son on New Year's Eve 1999. When he exited the ER he was shot and killed and found to be carrying an unloaded pellet gun.

Release
John Q. opened in first place, grossing $23.3 million during its first weekend. It ended up with a total domestic gross of $71 million and $102.2 million worldwide.

Reception
On Rotten Tomatoes John Q. holds an approval rating of 25% based on the 133 reviews, with an average rating of 4.5/10. The site's critics consensus reads, "Washington's performance rises above the material, but John Q pounds the audience over the head with its message." Metacritic gives the film a weighted average score of 30 out of 100, based on 33 critics, indicating "generally unfavorable reviews". Audiences polled by CinemaScore gave the film an average grade of "A" on an A+ to F scale.

Hindi adaptation
Zee Studios acquired the rights to John Q.'''s Hindi adaptation, titled Sanak, with Vidyut Jammwal in the lead role. Streaming service Hotstar acquired the film's distribution rights and released it on 15 October 2021 to mixed reviews from critics.

See also

 Denzel Washington on screen and stage
 Dog Day Afternoon, an earlier film with a similar hostage premiseMoney Monster, a later film with a similar hostage premise
 Health disparities
 Sugreeva Tathastu, a Hindi film (starring Sanjay Dutt and Ameesha Patel) that is an unofficial remake of John Q''.

References

External links

 
 
 

2002 films
2002 crime drama films

Films about health care
American crime drama films 
Fictional portrayals of the Chicago Police Department
Films directed by Nick Cassavetes
Films scored by Aaron Zigman
Films set in Chicago
Films set in Montana
Films shot in Alberta
Films shot in Hamilton, Ontario
Films shot in Montreal
Films shot in Toronto
Films set in hospitals
Films about hostage takings
Medical-themed films
New Line Cinema films
American police detective films
American crime thriller films
Films about father–son relationships
2000s English-language films
2000s American films
Films set in 2001
African-American films